Wickens is a surname, and may refer to:
 Aryness Joy Wickens (1901–1991), American statistician and wife of David L. Wickens
 David L. Wickens (1890–1970), South Dakota State Senator and husband of Aryness Joy Wickens
 George Michael Wickens (1918–2006), British-Canadian academic specialising in Persian Culture
 Gerald Ernest Wickens (1927–2019), British botanist
 Jodie Wickens (born 1982), Canadian politician
 Brian Wickens (born in 1947), a New Zealand wrestler
 Paul Wickens (born in 1956), British musician
 Robert Wickens (born in 1989), Canadian racing driver

See also
 Wicken (disambiguation)
 Wilkens

English-language surnames
Surnames of English origin
Surnames of British Isles origin